Internationalism is a left communist group in Venezuela.

The party was founded in 1964 around Marc Chirik, a member of the Left Communists of France until the latter's dissolution in 1952. It published ten issues of its review Internacionalismo between 1964 and 1968. The group participated in the founding conference of the International Communist Current (ICC) in 1975, and is today the ICC's section in Venezuela where it still publishes the review of the same name.

External links
Internacionalismo journal.

International Communist Current
Communist parties in Venezuela
Political parties established in 1964
1964 establishments in Venezuela
Left communist organizations